It Can Be Done Amigo (Italian: Si può fare... amigo) is a 1972 Spanish / Italian / French film directed by Maurizio Lucidi.

The film is also known as Saddle Tramps (English title in Canada)

Plot summary 
Coburn is pursued by the gunfighter and pimp Sonny, who wants to kill him for seducing Sonny’s sister Mary, but not until they have married so she is made an honest woman. When they confront, Sonny usually gets knocked out. Coburn meets the boy Chip, whose uncle has just died, and follows him to his hometown. They settle in Chip’s house. Franciscus, the town priest, sheriff and judge – who is rumoured to be responsible for people being run out of the area – offers to buy the place and so does eventually a stranger who buys pieces of clay and tastes them. Chip does refuse the mounting offers, to Coburn's consternation. Franciscus allies with Sonny, and they capture Coburn and marry him. However, when Sonny is about to shoot Coburn Mary says that she is pregnant, so Sonny decides to postpone the killing until the child is 21. Franciscus protests and is knocked out. He sends his secret partner, the horse thief Big Jim (who earlier received a good thrashing when he tried to rob a bank where Coburn was to make a deposit) to shoot Coburn. But Sonny, who is promised one third of the house by Chip, shoots off his pants. Franciscus and Big Jim return in force when the wedding party has started, and there is a big brawl. The fireworks explode and oil gushes from the well. The bandits are flattened, but Franciscus leaves together with Sonny and the whores. Mary reveals to Coburn that she lied about the pregnancy, and he sets about to redress this so enthusiastically that the whole house falls down, while Chip smiles.

Cast 
Bud Spencer as Hiram Coburn
Jack Palance as Sonny Bronston 
Renato Cestiè as Chip Anderson
Francisco Rabal as Franciscus
Dany Saval as Mary Bronston
Luciano Catenacci as James
Roberto Camardiel as L'udriaco
Franco Giacobini as the man who eats mud
Serena Michelotti as the Warren widow
Manuel Guitián
Salvatore Borghese
Marcello Verziera
Dominique Badou
Dante Cleri
Luciano Pigozzi
Dalila Di Lazzaro
Luciano Bonanni
Franca Viganò

Reception
In his investigation of narrative structures in Spaghetti Western films, Fridlund notes that while Coburn is indeed very similar to the Bud Spencer's Bambino character in They Call Me Trinity and Trinity Is Still My Name, some of the properties of the Trinity character in the latter films here are carried by Sonny (quick gun and unwanted partner) and Chip (unpredictable partner). Also, instead of the heroes helping religious communities in the Trinity films, the villain is (disguised as) a priest in It Can Be Done Amigo.

Releases
Wild East released this in its uncut theatrical dramatic form on a limited edition R0 NTSC DVD in 2011

Soundtrack

Notes

External links 

1972 films
1970s Western (genre) comedy films
1970s Italian-language films
Films directed by Maurizio Lucidi
Films shot in Almería
Films with screenplays by Rafael Azcona
1972 comedy films
Spanish Western (genre) comedy films
Italian Western (genre) comedy films
French Western (genre) comedy films
1970s Italian films
1970s French films